Bernard Jourdan (1 February 1918 – 18 August 2003) was a 20th-century French writer. In 1961, his novel  published in 1960 by Fayard earned him the Prix des Deux Magots.

Selected works 
1957: La Graine au vent
1961: Saint-Picoussin
1963: Douleur d'airain
1988: Monologue de l'an
1992: Dix-sept élégies
1998: L'Hiver qui vient, poèmes

External links 
 Bernard Jourdan on Babelio

20th-century French novelists
Prix des Deux Magots winners
People from Var (department)
1918 births
2003 deaths